Ñuble Province may refer to:

 , a former province (first-level administrative division) of Chile
 Ñuble Province (1974–2018), a former province (second-level administrative division) of Chile
 Ñuble Region, a current region of Chile

See also
 Ñuble (disambiguation)